Omorgus undaraensis is a species of hide beetle in the subfamily Omorginae.

References

undaraensis
Beetles described in 2014